The abbreviation IOR may refer to:

 Importer of record, term in import and export
 inclusive or - as opposed to XOR (exclusive OR)
 Independent Order of Rechabites
 Index of refraction
 India Office Records
 Indian Ocean Region
 Indian Ocean Rim, e.g. as in Indian Ocean Rim Association
 Inhibition of return, a phenomenon in visual perception
 Interleaved or Random, a computer benchmark for I/O
 International Offshore Rule, an early handicapping system for yacht racing
 Interoperable Object Reference, a reference to a CORBA or RMI-IIOP object
 Institute of Refrigeration, a UK scientific charity and membership organisation
 Institute of Recruiters, a non-profit Institute for recruiters and HR professionals 
 Istituto per le Opere di Religione (Institute for Religious Works), the "Vatican Bank"
 Interest on Reserves, a term used in macroeconomics having to do with reserves placed at the central bank 
 IORgroup Ltd (formerly Interiors of Richmond), a London-based commercial interior design company
 I.O.R., optics company of Romania
 IOR (formerly Inland Oil Refiners) is the company that owns and operates the Eromanga Refinery in outback Queensland, Australia
 IOR, IATA airport code for Inishmore Aerodrome